Frederick Hergert (January 29, 1912 — July 15, 1998) was a Canadian professional ice hockey player who played 19 games in the National Hockey League with the New York Americans between 1935 and 1936. The rest of his career, which lasted from 1931 to 1951, was spent in the minor leagues. He was born in Calgary, Alberta.

Career statistics

Regular season and playoffs

External links

1912 births
1998 deaths
Canadian expatriate ice hockey players in the United States
Canadian ice hockey centres
Cleveland Falcons players
Cleveland Indians (IHL) players
Detroit Olympics (IHL) players
Hershey Bears players
Kansas City Greyhounds players
New York Americans players
Philadelphia Arrows players
Pittsburgh Hornets players
Rochester Cardinals players
St. Louis Flyers (AHA) players
St. Louis Flyers players
Ice hockey people from Calgary
Syracuse Stars (IHL) players
Western International Hockey League players